Tajabad-e Kohneh (also Romanized as Tājābād-e Kohneh; also known as Tājābād) is a village in Azadegan Rural District, in the Central District of Rafsanjan County, Kerman Province, Iran. At the 2006 census, its population was 949, in 237 families.

References 

Populated places in Rafsanjan County